The Montreux–Glion–Rochers-de-Naye railway line is an electrically operated rack railway in Switzerland with a track gauge of . The line connects the resort of Montreux, on the shores of Lake Geneva, with the summit of the Rochers de Naye mountain. The line operates via the village of Glion, on the mountainside above Montreux, where it connects with the Territet–Glion funicular.

The line was originally built as two separate lines by two different companies, the Chemin de fer Glion–Rochers-de-Naye (GN) and the Chemin de fer Montreux–Glion (MGI). Today, the line is owned and operated by Transports Montreux–Vevey–Riviera.

Since 2017, the line is operated with original Belle Epoque carriages preserved and restored by the MOB company.

History

Glion to Rochers-de-Naye 
The first section of the line to open was the Glion to Rochers-de-Naye railway, which was built by the Chemin de fer Glion–Rochers-de-Naye company (GN), and opened in 1892. Initially Glion was reached by the Territet–Glion funicular, which departed from a lower terminus opposite Territet station, the first station east of Montreux station on the Simplon railway.

Montreux to Glion 
In 1909, the Montreux to Glion railway opened, built by the Chemin de fer Montreux-Glion company (MGl). This ran from a lower terminus within Montreux station, and at its upper end made an end-to-end junction with the Glion to Rochers-de-Naye line. A cross-platform interchange was retained between both lines and the Territet-Glion funicular.

The Montreux to Glion railway was built to the same gauge and rack system as the Glion to Rochers-de-Naye railway, but was electrically operated from the start. Until 1938, when the Glion to Rochers-de-Naye line was electrified, trains were handed over in Glion between electric and steam locomotives. At the same time, electric railcars took over most services, leaving freight and peak traffic, service trains and snow blowing to the electric locomotives.

Merger 
Even after through railcars took over most services, the two lines remained the property of different companies. The two companies finally merged in 1987, to form the Chemin de fer de Montreux–Glion–Rochers-de-Naye company (MGN). In 1992 this company merged with the Territet-Glion funicular to form the Chemin de fer Montreux–Territet–Glion–Rochers-de-Naye company (MTGN).

In 2001, the MTGN was merged into Transports Montreux-Vevey-Riviera (MVR), a company that operates a number of railway lines in the Montreux area. It is marketed under the ''Golden Pass Services' banner.

Closures 
In May 2008 the Montreux to Glion section of the line was closed so that work on the lining of the Tunnel de Valmont could be carried out. It reopened on schedule on 2 June ready for the summer season. During this closure the Glion to Caux and Rochers de Naye section had operated normally with the Montreux to Glion section being covered by a replacement bus service.

Route 
The railway from Montreux, which departs from platform 8 of the main line Montreux railway station, begins to climb steeply almost as soon as it leaves the station and enters the first of many tunnels. The line changes direction by a series of minimum radius curves, views of Lake Geneva alternating from side to side, before reaching the station at Glion. The workshops and depot are alongside the line as it leaves Glion, the main shops accessed from a traverser set off a loop line alongside the main line.

The line continues higher to the small village of Caux passing through Alpine meadows which, in the Springtime, are full of wild growing narcissus, forget-me-nots and others, before reaching its upper terminus at Rochers-de-Naye, the home of the Marmot Paradise, a centre where seven varieties of these small mammals can be seen in a natural environment. From here there are views over Lake Geneva and across to the French Alps.

The line uses track of  gauge and the rack and pinion system devised by Roman Abt. It is electrified using 850 V DC supplied by overhead lines. Passing loops are situated in the stations at Glion, Caux, Paccot and Jaman.

Rolling stock

Locomotives

Railcars

Abbreviations.
(b) Fitted for multiple unit with two or three double headed motor coaches serie Bhe 4/8 301-305.
(c) Carries "Marmot Paradis" livery
(d) Carries "Pere Noel" livery, (marking the visit of Santa to Rochers de Naye).
(e) No.302 carries "Veytaux" nameplate low down on cab side on front (uphill) cab. Name removed from locomotive No.3 which is now unnamed.
(f) Painted in new  "Golden Pass" gold/white livery from new.
BBC :  Brown, Boveri & Cie
SLM :  Swiss Locomotive and Machine Works, Winterthur
MFO :  Maschinenfabrik Oerlikon

Rotary Snowplow

Preserved Coaches

Coaches of the Montreux-Glion Railway are restored to original red livery, usually kept at Glion and work with Locomotive No.2. During its time at the line also worked with steam locomotive No.1.
Coach No.16 is painted a dark blue livery with lighter blue panels. Also worked with steam locomotive No.1.

Services
The line operates throughout the year, and provides an hourly service in each direction between Montreux and Rochers de Naye from around 09:00 to dusk. Additional services between Montreux and Caux operate in the early morning, in the evenings, and during peak periods. The trains are timed to offer connections at Montreux with main line services of the Swiss Federal Railways and MOB.

See also
List of mountain railways in Switzerland
List of heritage railways and funiculars in Switzerland

References

External links 
 
 Official web site of the Montreux–Glion–Rochers-de-Naye railway

800 mm gauge railways in Switzerland
Mountain railways
Rack railways in Switzerland
Railway lines in Switzerland
Railway lines opened in 1892
Transport in the canton of Vaud
Heritage railways in Switzerland
Transports Montreux–Vevey–Riviera lines
850 V DC railway electrification